Tribar may refer to:

 The Penrose Tribar, triangular figure
 Triathlon handlebars for bicycles
 Tribar weights exercise weights